Fidel is a given name from the Latin "Fidelis" meaning "faithful." The feminine derivative is Fidelia. Notable people with the name include:

 Fidel Dávila Arrondo (1878–1962), Spanish Army officer
 Fidel Castaño, Colombian drug lord and paramilitary
 Fidel Castro (1926-2016), Cuban socialist revolutionary and politician
 Fidel Edwards (born 1982) West-Indian cricketer
 Fidel Negrete (1932-2016), Mexican long-distance runner
 Fidel Nemenzo, Filipino mathematician, professor, and current chancellor of the University of the Philippines Diliman
 Fidel V. Ramos (1928–2022), Filipino military general, politician, and former president of the Philippines
 Fidel Alonso de Santocildes (1844-1895), Spanish general of the Cuban War of Independence
 Fidel Solórzano (born 1962), Ecuadorian decathlete
 Fidel Velázquez Sánchez (1900–1997), Mexican union leader
 Pen name of Guillermo Prieto (1818–97), Mexican writer
 Fidel Chaves de la Torre (born 1989), Spanish footballer better known as just Fidel

See also
 Fidelis (name), Latin equivalent

Spanish masculine given names